Desmiphora niveocincta is a species of beetle in the family Cerambycidae. It was described by Lane in 1959. It is known from Panama.

References

Desmiphora
Beetles described in 1959